Pethia macrogramma is a species of cyprinid fish native to Myanmar where it is only known from streams in the Myitkyina area.  It can reach a length of  SL.

References 

Pethia
Fish described in 2008
Barbs (fish)